Campus Sleuth is a 1948 American film, part of The Teen Agers series.

Plot

Cast
 Freddie Stewart as Freddie Trimball
 June Preisser as Dodie Rogers
 Warren Mills as Lee Watson
 Noel Neill as Betty Rogers
 Donald MacBride as Insp. Watson
 Monte Collins as Dean McKinley
 Stan Ross as Richard Winkler
 Paul Beyar as Houser
 Harry Tyler as Mr. Rogers

References

External links
Campus Sleuth at IMDb

1948 films
1948 comedy films
Monogram Pictures films
Films directed by Will Jason
American black-and-white films
1940s English-language films